Mathieu Goubel (born April 3, 1980) is a French sprint canoeist who has competed since the late 1990s. He has won four medals at the ICF Canoe Sprint World Championships with a silver (C-1 1000 m: 2009 and three bronzes (C-1 500 m: 2009, C-1 4 × 200 m: 2009, C-4 500 m: 1999). He has won two gold medals and three silver medals at the European Championships.

At the 2008 Summer Olympics in Beijing, Goubel finished fourth in the C-1 500 m final and seventh in the C-1 1000 m final.

At the 2012 Summer Olympics in London, Goubel was the fastest qualifier from the semifinals but finished fifth in the C-1 1000 m final A. He finished seventh in the C-1 200 m final A.

References
Canoe09.ca profile 

Sports-reference.com profile

1980 births
Canoeists at the 2008 Summer Olympics
Canoeists at the 2012 Summer Olympics
French male canoeists
Living people
Olympic canoeists of France
ICF Canoe Sprint World Championships medalists in Canadian
Canoeists at the 2015 European Games
European Games competitors for France
21st-century French people